Eyes Behind the Stars is a 1978 Italian sci-fi film directed by Mario Gariazzo (here credited as Roy Garrett).

Cast

 Robert Hoffmann: Tony Harris
 Nathalie Delon: Monica Stiles
 Martin Balsam: Inspector Jim Grant
 Sherry Buchanan: Karin Hale
 Victor Valente: Coleman Perry
 Sergio Rossi: Leader of 'The Silencers' 
 Mario Novelli: 'The Silencers' Henchman (credited as Antony Freeman) 
 Carlo Hintermann: Air Marshal Thompson  
 George Ardisson: Agent for 'The Silencers'

References

External links

1978 films
1970s Italian-language films
Films directed by Mario Gariazzo
Italian science fiction films
Films scored by Marcello Giombini
1970s science fiction films
1970s Italian films